The Seven Dresses of Katrin is a 1954 West German romantic comedy film directed by Hans Deppe and starring Sonja Ziemann, Paul Klinger, and Georg Thomalla. The film tells the story of a woman's life through seven dresses she wears.

It was shot at the Spandau and Tempelhof Studios in Berlin. The film's sets were designed by the art director Willi Herrmann.

Cast

References

Bibliography

External links 
 

1954 films
West German films
German romantic comedy films
1954 romantic comedy films
1950s German-language films
Films directed by Hans Deppe
Films based on Austrian novels
Constantin Film films
Films shot at Tempelhof Studios
Films shot at Spandau Studios
German black-and-white films
1950s German films